George Chandler Tully (March 12, 1904 – May 1, 1980) was an American football end who played one season with the Frankford Yellow Jackets of the National Football League. Tully played football at Dartmouth College and attended East Orange High School in East Orange, New Jersey. He was a Consensus All-American in 1925. He was also a member of the Philadelphia Quakers of the American Football League.

College career
Tully played football at Dartmouth College and was a Consensus All-American in 1925. Dartmouth claims the 1925 national championship as does the Alabama Crimson Tide. Tully was one of three Consensus All-Americans that represented Dartmouth in 1925. The other two were Carl Diehl and Andy Oberlander.

Professorial career

Philadelphia Quakers
In 1926, Tully played in ten games for the Philadelphia Quakers, and scored one receiving touchdown. The Quakers won the AFL Championship with a record of 8–2. Tully was chosen as an All-Pro by former NFL player Wilfred Smith of the Chicago Tribune , who presented a combined NFL-AFL 1926 All-Pro Team. The AFL folded after one season.

Frankford Yellow Jackets

References

External links
Just Sports Stats

1904 births
1980 deaths
East Orange High School alumni
Players of American football from New Jersey
American football ends
Dartmouth Big Green football players
Philadelphia Quakers (AFL) players
Frankford Yellow Jackets players
All-American college football players
People from Orange, New Jersey
Sportspeople from East Orange, New Jersey